The  superyacht New Secret was launched by Amels Holland B.V. at their yard in Vlissingen. She was designed by Tim Heywood, and the interior design was created by Winch Design. She has two sister ships, the 2016 built Plvs Vltra and the 2018 built Universe. She was delivered to her owner, Lopes Family of São Paulo, Brazil, in June 2019.

Design 
The hull is built out of steel while the superstructure is made out of aluminium with teak laid decks. The yacht is classed by Lloyd's registered and flagged in the Marshall Islands.

See also
 List of motor yachts by length
 List of yachts built by Amels BV

References

2017 ships
Motor yachts
Ships built in the Netherlands